Gerald Mills Hendrie, (born 28 October 1935; at Westcliff-on-Sea, Essex), is an English scholar, composer, organist, pianist and harpsichordist.

Education 
 Framlingham College, Suffolk, 1949–52, Foundation Scholar
 Royal College of Music (RCM), 1952–54, Foundation Scholar, Piano (ARCM in Organ Performing 1953, Piano Teaching 1953, Piano Performing 1954); Gained Sir Walter Parratt prize.
 Selwyn College, Cambridge 1954–61, Organ Scholar. (BA 1957, MusB with distinction 1958, MA 1961, Ph.D. 1962); 
 Royal College of Organists (RCO), FRCO (1956)
 Studied at the RCM with Geoffrey Tankard, Harold Darke, William Harris, Herbert Howells; at Cambridge with Thurston Dart and Patrick Hadley; privately with Geraint Jones, John Dykes Bower, Ralph Downes, and André Marchal

Locums 
 Christmas 1955, Acting Assistant Organist, Canterbury Cathedral including first-ever Eurovision
Broadcast, ‘Carols from Canterbury’.
 1960-61 Acting Organist and Choirmaster, Norwich Cathedral
 During 1962, Acting Assistant Organist, Ely Cathedral

Academic posts 
 Director of Music, Homerton College, Cambridge 1962-3
 Lecturer in Music, University of Manchester 1963-7
 Founding Professor of Music, University of Victoria, British Columbia 1967-69
 Founding Professor of Music, Open University 1969-85 (early retirement)
 Director of Studies in Music, St John's College, Cambridge 1980-83
 Visiting Fellow, University of Western Australia 1985 (following earlier visits)

Publications (articles & editions) 
 An Edition and Critical Study of the Keyboard Music of Orlando Gibbons (1583-1625), 2 vols., doctoral dissertation University of Cambridge October 1961 
 The Keyboard Music of Orlando Gibbons in Proceedings of the Royal Musical Association vol. 89, 1962/63 
 Handel's 'Chandos' and Associated Anthems: An Introductory Survey in ed. Peter Williams, Bach, Handel, Scarlatti 1685-1985, Tercentenary Essays, Cambridge University Press 1985
 Half-way Towards the 21 st Century: Music at Britain's Open University 1970-85 in International
Journal of Music Education May 1985
 Some Reflections on the Keyboard Music of Jean-Philippe Rameau (1683-1764) in Studies in Music, Number 22, 1988, University of Western Australia Department of Music
 The English Lute-Songs 1st Series, vol. 17, co-editor with Thurston Dart of John Coprario: Funeral Teares, Songs of Mourning, The Masque of Squires Stainer & Bell 1959
 Musica Britannica XX, Orlando Gibbons: Keyboard Music (= Collected Keyboard Music) Stainer & Bell for the Royal Musical Association 1962, 2nd revised edition 1974, 3rd revised edition 2010
 Hallische Händel-Ausgabe/Halle Handel Society, Collected Works of Georg Friedrich Händel, Anthems für Cannons 3 vols. Bärenreiter 1985, 1987, 1991; Anthems für die Chapel Royal Bärenreiter 1994, Utrecht Te Deum & Jubilate Bärenreiter 1998
 Gilbert & Sullivan: The Operas (critical editions in full score) Iolanthe 3 vols., The Broude Trust NY 2018; Iolanthe vocal score, The Broude Trust 2019

Publications (compositions)

Piano 
 Five Bagatelles for Piano Stainer & Bell 1980 
 Four Excursions for Piano Stainer & Bell 1983 
 Sonata: In Praise of Reconciliation  (an arrangement of Organ Sonata, commemorates 50th anniversary of end of WW2)           	Anglo-American, henceforth AAMP 1997 
 A Handful of Rags Gérard Billaudot Editeur, Paris 2015 
 Another Handful of Rags Gérard Billaudot Editeur, Paris 2015

Organ 
 Speculo Petro AAMP 1968 
 Choral: Hommage à César Franck AAMP 1990 
 Le Tombeau de Marcel Dupré  (= Toccata & Fugue*, Prelude & Fugue, Prelude & Fugue on the name BACH, Two Sketches on the name BACH, published individually) AAMP 1990-92 
recorded by John Scott, Church of St. Ignatius Loyola NY, 20th-Century Masterpieces Priory records 1998,  Gabriel Dessauer at St Bonifatius, Wiesbaden (GEMA 1999) and Paul Carr at St Chad's Cathedral, Birmingham UK, French Flavours, Regent Records 2012); also on YouTube from Washington Cathedral, USA. 
 Sonata: In Praise of St Asaph  (commissioned by St Asaph Festival, UK) AAMP 1994 
 Sonata: In Praise of Reconciliation  (a US commission; see also above, Piano) AAMP 1997

Flute & Piano 
 Three Pieces         AAMP 1985

Brass 
 Quintet for Brass (for the Philip Jones Brass Ensemble)                               AAMP 1988

Church Music 
 As I outrode this endris night  (i) carol for SS, organ or piano  Novello 1959; recorded by the cathedral choirs of Canterbury, York Minster, Carlisle; also by Selwyn College, Cambridge  & others (ii) for SATB Novello 1978; this version for the Service of Nine Lessons & * Carols, King's College Cambridge.              
 Sweet was the Song the Virgin Sang, carol for SS, Organ/Piano Novello 1960 
 There is no Rose, carol for SATB, Novello 1984, recorded by Lichfield Cathedral Choir, Nimbus Records 1996
 Four Consolations (texts by Boethius) for SATB unacc.  Paraclete 1996                                                  
 Ave verum Corpus for ATB/SATB unacc. Williams School of Church Music 1978, subsequently AAMP    
 If thou wouldst see God's laws, SATB, organ or piano  AAMP 1988
 Preces and Responses, SATB, for St John's College, Cambridge  AAMP 1980s
 Magnificat & Nunc Dimittis, SATB, organ, for St John's College, Cambridge   AAMP 1986
 Magnificat & Nunc Dimittis, SATB, organ, for New College, Oxford  AAMP 1986                                                                  
 Te Deum & Jubilate, men's voices and organ, for St Paul's Cathedral, London  AAMP 1998
 Magnificat & Nunc Dimittis boy's voices and organ, for St Paul's Cathedral, London  AAMP 1988
 Magnificat & Nunc Dimittis, SATB, organ, for Canterbury Cathedral  AAMP 1993 
 Magnificat & Nunc Dimittis, ATB, organ, for Canterbury Cathedral  AAMP 1994
 Requiem for soprano solo, SATB and organ, optional timpani (3), cello (premiered in Auch Festival, France)       AAMP 1997

Unpublished/unsubmitted 
 Missa Aquitaniae for soprano solo, SATB, organ (premiered in Auch Festival, 2003                  
 Sounat Campanetos carol for SATB, Gascon & English texts, 2005    
 Twelve New Rags for Piano (four of which are arranged for organ) (2015–19)    
 Pastorale & Fughetta & Chaconne for organ (2018–20) 
 Concert Studies Nos. 1-3 for organ for Andrea Albertin (2021)
 Concert Studies Nos. 4-5 for organ for Tom Winpenny (2022)
 Sicilienne: Hommage à Maurice Duruflé for Tom Winpenny (2022)

Performance 
 He has performed as organist, pianist and harpsichordist around the world and broadcast for ABC, BBC, CBC.
 Guest recitalist at the Halle Handel Festival 1981.

References 
 Choral: Hommage à César Franck, review by Paul Hale in Organists’ Review, December 1990
 W. S. Gilbert and Arthur Sullivan. Iolanthe. Full Score. Review by James Brooks Kuykendall in Notes, December 2018
 Iolanthe Full Score published by The Broude Trust. Review by Roger Wild in Sullivan Society journal, January 2019
 Requiem review by Paul Hale in Organists’ Review, August 1999

English composers
English harpsichordists
English organists
Alumni of the Royal College of Music
1935 births
People from Essex
Living people
Alumni of Selwyn College, Cambridge
English musicologists
Academics of the University of Cambridge